Eightmile is an unincorporated community in Morrow County, Oregon, United States, on Oregon Route 206 (the Wasco–Heppner Highway), at an elevation of .

The town was named by pioneer ranchers after its location on Eightmile Canyon, which was so named because its mouth was about  up Willow Creek from the Columbia River. Eightmile's post office was established in 1883 and closed in 1941.

References

External links
Historic image of the road between Lonerock and Eightmile from Salem Public Library

Pendleton–Hermiston Micropolitan Statistical Area
Unincorporated communities in Morrow County, Oregon
1883 establishments in Oregon
Populated places established in 1883
Unincorporated communities in Oregon